is a 2020 Japanese animated film based on Violet Evergarden light novel series by Kana Akatsuki and a sequel to Violet Evergarden (2018). Produced by Kyoto Animation and distributed by Shochiku, the film is directed by Taichi Ishidate from a script written by Reiko Yoshida, and stars Yui Ishikawa and Daisuke Namikawa. In the film, Violet Evergarden continues in her search for the meaning of the final words left by Gilbert Bougainvillea when she receives a request to write a letter from a boy named Yuris.

Initially teased in March 2018 as a new project, it was revealed in July to be an anime film. Ishidate and Yoshida were revealed as part of the film's staff in April 2019. The film suffered setbacks following an arson attack at one of Kyoto Animation's studio buildings and the COVID-19 pandemic.

Violet Evergarden: The Movie premiered in Japan on September 18, 2020. The film grossed over million worldwide, and received awards and nominations, including the awards at Tokyo Anime Awards Festival and Japan Media Arts Festival.

Plot
Daisy, the granddaughter of Anne Magnolia, stumbles upon the letters sent to her grandmother during her birthdays. She becomes curious about the legend of Violet Evergarden, who is well-known for writing beautiful letters on behalf of her customers. More than half a century ago, Violet receives a request from a terminally ill boy named Yuris to write letters for his family. Meanwhile, Claudia Hodgins finds a mail with a vague address on it and recognizes the handwriting to be from Gilbert Bougainvillea, whom they thought to be dead. He manages to find its origin from the remote island of Ekarte and decides to bring Violet with him. Upon reaching the island, Claudia finds Gilbert alive yet missing his right eye and arm. Gilbert declines to meet Violet due to his guilt of bringing her misery, thinking that she will be happier without him. Violet tries to meet him but the latter insists on not wanting to see her, causing her to emotionally break down. 

A storm prevents Violet and Claudia from leaving the island when they received a telegraph message stating that Yuris' condition has worsened. Violet has one last task to write a letter for Yuri's friend Lucas so she asks Iris Cannary to substitute for her. Benedict Blue brings Iris to the hospital, where they find Yuris unable to rise from bed. They decide to let him talk to Lucas via telephone to deliver his final message. After his death, Yuris' parents take turns in reading the letters he requested from Violet. Violet writes a final letter to Gilbert before she and Claudia leave the island. Touched by her words and the support of his brother Dietfried, Gilbert chases Violet as she boards a ship. He reunites with Violet when she jumps off the ship and tells her about his love for her, promising that he will stay by her side from now on. Violet later resigns from CH Postal Company to live with Gilbert on the island. Back in the present, Daisy visits the island to learn from the locals about their history with Violet and writes a letter to her parents.

Voice cast

Production
In March 2018, the wrap-around jacket for newly-released Violet Evergarden Gaiden light novel volume by Kana Akatsuki revealed that there was a "new project in progress". At the Violet Evergarden Film & Concert special event in July 2018, the project was revealed to be an anime film based on Akatsuki's light novel series. Taichi Ishidate was revealed to be directing the film at Kyoto Animation in April 2019, along with Reiko Yoshida as the screenwriter and Akiko Takase as the character designer. Ishidate initially hesitated to helm the direct sequel to the 2018 anime television series Violet Evergarden because its ending was the "entirety of the story I intended to tell", but later "spurred to action" after reading Yoshida's script that made him think that it was "fine for Gilbert [Bougainvillea] to live". In July 2019, an arson attack took place at one of Kyoto Animation's studio buildings, destroying most of their upcoming projects in the works and past animation materials from the fire. Violet Evergarden Production Committee announced in September 2019 that the production work on the film was "still continuing", while the scheduled January 2020 release was delayed. The film was shot with a 2.31:1 screen ratio instead of 16:9 that was previously used for Violet Evergarden anime series, which was initially proposed by director Haruka Fujita and used in the 2019 film Violet Evergarden: Eternity and the Auto Memory Doll.

Music
Evan Call was revealed to be composing Violet Evergarden: The Movie in April 2019, after previously doing so for Violet Evergarden and Violet Evergarden: Eternity and the Auto Memory Doll. In February 2020,  the film's theme music was revealed to be performed by True titled "Will", with its single being released in Japan on September 16. The film's original soundtrack is included in Call's soundtrack album titled Violet Evergarden: Echo Through Eternity, which was released in Japan on October 21, 2020.

Marketing
A teaser trailer and a key visual for Violet Evergarden: The Movie were released in April 2019. The film's second teaser trailer and key visual were respectively released in February and March 2020. In March 2020, the film held collaboration with instant noodle brand Acecook in promoting its release.

Release

Theatrical
Violet Evergarden: The Movie premiered in Japan on September 18, 2020, and was released in Dolby Cinema on November 13, making it the first stand-alone Japanese animated film to do so as opposed to compilation films that were previously released. The film was previously scheduled to be released on January 10, 2020, before it was shifted to April 24 due to the arson attack, and then to the September release due to the COVID-19 pandemic. The film was released in Australia and New Zealand by Madman Entertainment on December 3, 2020, in the United States and Canada by Funimation on March 30, 2021, and in the United Kingdom and Ireland by Anime Limited on July 1, 2021.

Home media
Violet Evergarden: The Movie was released on Blu-ray and DVD in Japan on October 13, 2021, from its original August 4 release, delayed due to "issues with production and manufacturing because of the ongoing state of emergency". The film was released in 4K and HDR with its Blu-ray special edition, making it the first film from Kyoto Animation to be released in those formats for a home video release.

Netflix began streaming the film in the United States on October 13, 2021, and in Japan on April 13, 2022. Anime Limited released the film in the United Kingdom and Ireland on 4K Ultra HD Blu-ray on August 29, 2022, and released it with 4K UHD and Blu-ray collector's edition, and Blu-ray standard edition on December 5. Crunchyroll is set to release the film on 4K Ultra HD and Blu-ray combo pack, regular and limited editions, and stand-alone Blu-ray on May 30, 2023.

Reception

Box office
Violet Evergarden: The Movie grossed million in Japan and million in other territories, for a worldwide total of million. The film is the second highest-grossing anime film produced by Kyoto Animation and the seventh highest-grossing domestic film of 2020 in Japan.

Violet Evergarden: The Movie earned million in its opening weekend (including Monday and Tuesday holidays) in Japan, ranking second behind Christopher Nolan's Tenet (2020). The film earned million in its second weekend, staying at second place, and reached the one-billion-yen box office in its third weekend after earning million. Over 1 million tickets were sold for the film in its fifth weekend. The film remained in the top ten Japanese box office ranking for 11 consecutive weeks since its release. The film grossed billion (million) in its twelfth weekend.

Critical response
The review aggregator website Rotten Tomatoes reported a 100% approval rating, with an average score of 9.2/10, based on 9 reviews. The Japanese review and survey firm Filmarks reported that the film had an approval rating of 4.39, ranking it first in their Satisfaction Ranking of 2020 survey.

Violet Evergarden: The Movie received praise from Japanese video game designer Hideo Kojima. Phuong Le at The Guardian gave the film 4 out of 5 stars, lauding its "breathtaking" animation. He felt that the film served not just a "closure for the character but also a moving return for one of Japan’s most beloved animation studios" following the arson attack. Richard Eisenbeis of Anime News Network graded the film "A", describing it as "fantastic" and an "emotional experience with a deep insight into the human condition". He lauded the three overlapping stories that would "destroy you emotionally", "vibrant" visuals, and "perfectly composed" music. Eisenbeis' colleague Kim Morrissy graded the film "B", finding its two-hour runtime a "detriment for the kind of storytelling it was going for" since she noted that the franchise worked "best in short and sweet installments" while feeling that the plot about Violet and Gilbert was "flat".

Accolades

|-
! scope="row" rowspan="7" | 2021
| Mainichi Film Awards
| Best Animation Film
| rowspan="2" | Violet Evergarden: The Movie
| 
| 
|-
| rowspan="3" | Tokyo Anime Awards Festival
| Anime of the Year (Feature Film)
| 
| rowspan="3" | 
|-
| Individual Award for Writers
| Reiko Yoshida
| 
|-
| Individual Award for Visual Artists
| Mikiko Watanabe
| 
|-
| Kyoto Digital Amusement Awards
| Kyoto Governor's Award
| rowspan="3" | Violet Evergarden: The Movie
| 
| 
|-
| Japan Media Arts Festival
| Excellence Award
| 
| 
|-
| Japan Academy Film Prize
| Animation of the Year
| 
|

Notes

References

External links
  
 
 

2020 anime films
2020 films
2020s Japanese-language films
Anime films based on light novels
Anime postponed due to the COVID-19 pandemic
Fictional cyborgs
Films postponed due to the COVID-19 pandemic
Japanese animated films
Japanese sequel films
Kyoto Animation
Shochiku films